Bob Hoskins (1942–2014) was an English actor

Bob Hoskins may also refer to:

Bob Hoskins (American football) (1945–1980), American football player
Bob Hoskins (philanthropist), evangelist and philanthropist